Inquiry-based learning (also spelled as enquiry-based learning in British English) is a form of active learning that starts by posing questions, problems or scenarios. It contrasts with traditional education, which generally relies on the teacher presenting facts and their own knowledge about the subject. Inquiry-based learning is often assisted by a facilitator rather than a lecturer. Inquirers will identify and research issues and questions to develop knowledge or solutions. Inquiry-based learning includes problem-based learning, and is generally used in small scale investigations and projects, as well as research. The inquiry-based instruction is principally very closely related to the development and practice of thinking and problem solving skills.

History 
Inquiry-based learning is primarily a pedagogical method, developed during the discovery learning movement of the 1960s as a response to traditional forms of instruction—where people were required to memorize information from instructional materials, such as direct instruction and rote learning.  The philosophy of inquiry based learning finds its antecedents in constructivist learning theories, such as the work of Piaget, Dewey, Vygotsky, and Freire among others, and can be considered a constructivist philosophy. Generating information and making meaning of it based on personal or societal experience is referred to as constructivism. Dewey's experiential learning pedagogy (that is, learning through experiences) comprises the learner actively participating in personal or authentic experiences to make meaning from it. Inquiry can be conducted through experiential learning because inquiry values the same concepts, which include engaging with the content/material in questioning, as well as investigating and collaborating to make meaning. Vygotsky approached constructivism as learning from an experience that is influenced by society and the facilitator. The meaning constructed from an experience can be concluded as an individual or within a group.

In the 1960s Joseph Schwab called for inquiry to be divided into three distinct levels. This was later formalized by Marshall Herron in 1971, who developed the Herron Scale to evaluate the amount of inquiry within a particular lab exercise. Since then, there have been a number of revisions proposed and inquiry can take various forms. There is a spectrum of inquiry-based teaching methods available.

Characteristics 

Specific learning processes that people engage in during inquiry-learning include:

Creating questions of their own
Obtaining supporting evidence to answer the question(s)
Explaining the evidence collected
Connecting the explanation to the knowledge obtained from the investigative process
Creating an argument and justification for the explanation

Inquiry learning involves developing questions, making observations, doing research to find out what information is already recorded, developing methods for experiments, developing instruments for data collection, collecting, analyzing, and interpreting data, outlining possible explanations and creating predictions for future study.

Levels 

There are many different explanations for inquiry teaching and learning and the various levels of inquiry that can exist within those contexts. The article titled The Many Levels of Inquiry by Heather Banchi and Randy Bell (2008) clearly outlines four levels of inquiry.

Level 1: Confirmation Inquiry
The teacher has taught a particular science theme or topic. The teacher then develops questions and a procedure that guides students through an activity where the results are already known. This method is great to reinforce concepts taught and to introduce students into learning to follow procedures, collect and record data correctly and to confirm and deepen understandings.

Level 2: Structured Inquiry
The teacher provides the initial question and an outline of the procedure. Students are to formulate explanations of their findings through evaluating and analyzing the data that they collect.

Level 3: Guided Inquiry
The teacher provides only the research question for the students. The students are responsible for designing and following their own procedures to test that question and then communicate their results and findings.

Level 4: Open/True Inquiry
Students formulate their own research question(s), design and follow through with a developed procedure, and communicate their findings and results. This type of inquiry is often seen in science fair contexts where students drive their own investigative questions.

Banchi and Bell (2008) explain that teachers should begin their inquiry instruction at the lower levels and work their way to open inquiry in order to effectively develop students' inquiry skills. Open inquiry activities are only successful if students are motivated by intrinsic interests and if they are equipped with the skills to conduct their own research study.

Open/true inquiry learning 

An important aspect of inquiry-based learning is the use of open learning, as evidence suggests that only utilizing lower level inquiry is not enough to develop critical and scientific thinking to the full potential. Open learning has no prescribed target or result that people have to achieve.  There is an emphasis on the individual manipulating information and creating meaning from a set of given materials or circumstances. In many conventional and structured learning environments, people are told what the outcome is expected to be, and then they are simply expected to 'confirm' or show evidence that this is the case.

Open learning has many benefits. It means students do not simply perform experiments in a routine like fashion, but actually think about the results they collect and what they mean. With traditional non-open lessons there is a tendency for students to say that the experiment 'went wrong' when they collect results contrary to what they are told to expect. In open learning there are no wrong results, and students have to evaluate the strengths and weaknesses of the results they collect themselves and decide their value.

Open learning has been developed by a number of science educators including the American John Dewey and the German Martin Wagenschein.  Wagenschein's ideas particularly complement both open learning and inquiry-based learning in teaching work. He emphasized that students should not be taught bald facts, but should understand and explain what they are learning. His most famous example of this was when he asked physics students to tell him what the speed of a falling object was. Nearly all students would produce an equation, but no students could explain what this equation meant. Wagenschein used this example to show the importance of understanding over knowledge.

Inquisitive learning 
Sociologist of education Phillip Brown defined inquisitive learning as learning that is intrinsically motivated (e.g. by curiosity and interest in knowledge for its own sake), as opposed to acquisitive learning that is extrinsically motivated (e.g. by acquiring high scores on examinations to earn credentials). However, occasionally the term inquisitive learning is simply used as a synonym for inquiry-based learning.

Inquiry-based learning in academic disciplines

Inquiry learning in science education 

Inquiry learning has been used as a teaching and learning tool for thousands of years, however, the use of inquiry within public education has a much briefer history. Ancient Greek and Roman educational philosophies focused much more on the art of agricultural and domestic skills for the middle class and oratory for the wealthy upper class. It was not until the Enlightenment, or the Age of Reason, during the late 17th and 18th century that the subject of Science was considered a respectable academic body of knowledge. Up until the 1900s the study of science within education had a primary focus on memorizing and organizing facts.

John Dewey, a well-known philosopher of education at the beginning of the 20th century, was the first to criticize the fact that science education was not taught in a way to develop young scientific thinkers. Dewey proposed that science should be taught as a process and way of thinking – not as a subject with facts to be memorized. While Dewey was the first to draw attention to this issue, much of the reform within science education followed the lifelong work and efforts of Joseph Schwab. 
Joseph Schwab was an educator who proposed that science did not need to be a process for identifying stable truths about the world that we live in, but rather science could be a flexible and multi-directional inquiry driven process of thinking and learning. 
Schwab believed that science in the classroom should more closely reflect the work of practicing scientists. Schwab developed three levels of open inquiry that align with the breakdown of inquiry processes that we see today.

Students are provided with questions, methods and materials and are challenged to discover relationships between variables
Students are provided with a question, however, the method for research is up to the students to develop
Phenomena are proposed but students must develop their own questions and method for research to discover relationships among variables

Today, we know that students at all levels of education can successfully experience and develop deeper level thinking skills through scientific inquiry. The graduated levels of scientific inquiry outlined by Schwab demonstrate that students need to develop thinking skills and strategies prior to being exposed to higher levels of inquiry. Effectively, these skills need to be scaffolded by the teacher or instructor until students are able to develop questions, methods, and conclusions on their own. 
A catalyst for reform within North American science education was the 1957 launch of Sputnik, the Soviet Union satellite. This historical scientific breakthrough caused a great deal of concern around the science and technology education the American students were receiving. In 1958 the U.S. congress developed and passed the National Defense Education Act in order to provide math and science teachers with adequate teaching materials.

America's National Science Education Standards (NSES) (1996) outlines six important aspects pivotal to inquiry learning in science education.

Students should be able to recognize that science is more than memorizing and knowing facts.
Students should have the opportunity to develop new knowledge that builds on their prior knowledge and scientific ideas.
Students will develop new knowledge by restructuring their previous understandings of scientific concepts and adding new information learned.
Learning is influenced by students' social environment whereby they have an opportunity to learn from each other.
Students will take control of their learning.
The extent to which students are able to learn with deep understanding will influence how transferable their new knowledge is to real life contexts.

Inquiry learning in social studies & history 

The College, Career, and Civic Life (C3) Framework for Social Studies State Standards was a joint collaboration among states and social studies organizations, including the National Council for the Social Studies, designed to focus social studies education on the practice of inquiry, emphasizing "the disciplinary concepts and practices that support students as they develop the capacity to know, analyze, explain, and argue about interdisciplinary challenges in our social world."  The C3 Framework recommends an "Inquiry Arc" incorporating four dimensions: 1. developing questions and planning inquiries; 2. applying disciplinary concepts and tools; 3. evaluating primary sources and using evidence; and 4. communicating conclusions and taking informed action. For example, a theme for this approach could be an exploration of etiquette today and in the past. Students might formulate their own questions or begin with an essential question such as "Why are men and women expected to follow different codes of etiquette?" Students explore change and continuity of manners over time and the perspectives of different cultures and groups of people. They analyze primary source documents such as books of etiquette from different time periods and form conclusions that answer the inquiry questions. Students finally communicate their conclusions in formal essays or creative projects. They may also take action by recommending solutions for improving school climate.

Robert Bain in How Students Learn described a similar approach called "problematizing history". First a learning curriculum is organized around central concepts. Next, a question and primary sources are provided, such as eyewitness historical accounts. The task for inquiry is to create an interpretation of history that will answer the central question.  Students will form a hypothesis, collect and consider information and revisit their hypothesis as they evaluate their data.

Inquiry learning in Ontario's kindergarten program 

After Charles Pascal's report in 2009, the Canadian province of Ontario's Ministry of Education decided to implement a full day kindergarten program that focuses on inquiry and play-based learning, called The Early Learning Kindergarten Program. As of September 2014, all primary schools in Ontario started the program. The curriculum document outlines the philosophy, definitions, process and core learning concepts for the program. Bronfenbrenner's ecological model, Vygotsky's zone of proximal development, Piaget's child development theory and Dewey's experiential learning are the heart of the program's design. As research shows, children learn best through play, whether it is independently or in a group. Three forms of play are noted in the curriculum document, pretend or "pretense" play, socio-dramatic play and constructive play. Through play and authentic experiences, children interact with their environment (people and/or objects) and question things; thus leading to inquiry learning. A chart on page 15 clearly outlines the process of inquiry for young children, including initial engagement, exploration, investigation, and communication. The new program supports holistic approach to learning. For further details, please see the curriculum document.

Since the program is extremely new, there is limited research on its success and areas of improvement. One government research report was released with the initial groups of children in the new kindergarten program. The Final Report: Evaluation of the Implementation of the Ontario Full-Day Early-Learning Kindergarten Program from Vanderlee, Youmans, Peters, and Eastabrook (2012) conclude with primary research that high-need children improved more compared to children who did not attend Ontario's new kindergarten program. As with inquiry-based learning in all divisions and subject areas, longitudinal research is needed to examine the full extent of this teaching/learning method.

Inquiry learning to read in the Netherlands, for reading mature children only 

Since 2013 Dutch children have the opportunity of inquiry learning to read. The program is from the Dutch developmental psychologist Ewald Vervaet, is named  (OLL; 'Discovery Learning to Read') and has three parts. As of 2019, OLL is only available in Dutch.

OLL's main characteristic is that it is for children who are reading mature. Reading maturity is assessed with the Reading Maturity Test. It is a descriptive test that consists of two subtests. We present here the essentials.

In the writing test ('') the child writes his name, the words 'mam' and 'dad' and some names more, which he happens to know. In the reading test ('') the tester makes new, transparent (common, rare or nonsense) words which the child then tries to read. Testwords consist of three or four letters.

Suppose, Tim writes TIM, MAM, DAD and SOFIE (Tims sister). Good testwords are SIT, (nonsense word) FOM and MIST. When Tim reads SIT as 's, i, t', he only analyses the sounds of the word. He is definitely not reading mature then.

However, when Tims reaction on SIT is first 's, i, t' and then 'sit', he analyses-and-synthesizes. He then is reading mature of almost so for there are some conditions more such as analysing-and-synthesizing of words of four letters and absence of mirror writing in the writing test.

If a child is reading mature, he can start with OLL. The essential element of OLL are the discovering pages. See the discovering page for the letter 'k' below. The Dutch word '' is the English word 'cat'; Dutch '' is English 'snail', Dutch '' is English 'cherry' and Dutch '' is English 'fork'. 

In earlier chapters the child has discovered the letters 'a', 't', 's', 'l', 'e', 'r', 'v' and 'o' in similar discovering pages. Consequently, the novelty in the discovering page for the letter 'k' is the figure 'k': obviously, the figure 'k' is a letter in the Dutch alphabet, but how does 'k' sound? The child finds this out by making hypotheses: is the one animal perhaps a snail, 'slak' in Dutch? If so, the word below sounds as /slak/; the child reads 's, l, a, k; slak'; hypothesis confirmed! Similarly with 'k, a, t; kat', 'k, e, r, s; kers' and 'v, o, r, k; vork'.
Consequently, the hypothesis 'That is a snail' has broadened itself to the hypothesis that 'k' sounds like /k/ as twice in the English word 'clock', and that hypothesis had proven to be tenable. Not just that: the process to find out how 'k' sounds, is rightly called a discovering process and Discovering Learing to Read clearly is a form of discovery or inquiry learning.

Discovery Learning to Read (DLR) in English

Phonemically speaking the Dutch language is much less transparent than almost completely transparent languages like Italian, Finnish and Czech, but much more transparent than languages like English and Danish. The classification of the British reading expert Debbie Hepplewhite (born in 1956) yields 217 letter-sound-combinations. The letter symbol 'a' for instance sounds on at least four ways: 'car', 'fat', 'saw' and 'table'. Conversely, the sound in 'table' is written on at least seven other ways: 'sundae', 'aid', 'straight', 'say', 'break', 'eight' and 'prey'. And so on.

Maybe a native speaker of English can construct enough discovering pages for all these 217 letter-sound-combinations, but the time being Discovery Learning to Read (DLR) looks only feasible with one or more auxiliary letters.

The very first discovering page could be with the word 'ɑnd' and would actually be a discovering page for the letters 'ɑ', 'n' and 'd'. 
In the second discovering page the letter 'm'-/m/ is discovered with 'mɑn', 'dɑm' and eventually 'mɑd' as discovering words.
In the third discovering page the letter 't'-/t/ is discovered with 'mɑt' en 'ɑnt' and possibly 'tɑn' as discovering words.
In the fourth discovering page the letter 'e'-/e/ is discovered with 'ten', 'net', 'tent' and 'men' as discovering words.
In the fifth discovering page the letter 'r'-/r/ is discovered with 'rɑt', 'trɑm' and 'red' (for instance on the basis of the British/USA-flag, with an arrow near the red parts).
In the sixth discovering page the letter 's'-/s/ is discovered with 'stem', 'nest', 'sɑnd' and 'ɑnts'.
In the seventh discovering page the letter 'p'-/p/ is discovered with 'pen', 'tɑp', 'pɑn' and 'mɑp'.
In the eighth discovering page the letter 'i'-/i/ is discovered with 'pin', 'tin', 'pit' and 'mist'.
In the ninth discovering page the first auxiliary letter could be discovered: the /ai/-sound of 'my', 'pie', 'find' and 'ice', for instance with the discovering words 'night'-/nait/, 'mice'-/mais/, 'pie'-/pai/ and 'rice'-/rais/. 

To make it clear to the child from the outset that 'ai' is not a standard letter but an auxiliary letter, this is told to him and this letter is presented in a different way than the standard letters, for example with a line through it and/or against a gray instead of white background: as 'ɑi', 'ɑi' or 'ɑi'.

There are two conditions for a discovering page with a non-standard letter symbol. The first is that such a letter symbol resembles the standard alphabet as much as possible. And the second condition is that in the case of a combination of letters, the child is familiar with the composing parts. With 'ɑi' both conditions are fulfilled: the parts are derived from the standard alphabet and the child knows 'ɑ' and 'i' from the first and the eighth discovering pages.

In Vervaets opinion, the aim should be to keep the number of non-standard letter symbols as low as possible. After all, whatever kind of positive purpose is aimed for with non-standard letter symbols, the child learns them for the time being and should replace them – preferably as early as possible – and thus unlearn them. The number of things to be unlearned should therefore not be greater than strictly necessary.

In later discovering pages the child discovers the correct spelling. The /ɑi/-sound has at least these six spellings:

'igh' – 'bright', 'fight', 'flight', 'high', 'knight', 'light', 'might', 'nigh', 'night', 'plight', 'right', 'sigh', 'sight', 'slight', 'thigh', 'tight';
'ie' – 'die', 'hie', 'lie', 'pie', 'tie', 'vie';
'i(nd)' – 'behind', 'bind', 'blind', 'find', 'kind', 'mind', 'rind', 'wind';
'y' – by', 'cry', 'dry', 'fly', 'fry', 'my', 'pry', 'shy', 'sky', 'spy', 'try', 'why';
'ei' – 'eider', 'eiderdown';
'i(consonant)e' – 'jibe', 'nice', 'tide', 'life', 'oblige', 'bike', 'file', 'time', 'fine', 'ripe', 'wise', 'kite', 'dive', 'size'.

Misconceptions about inquiry 

There are several common misconceptions regarding inquiry-based science, the first being that inquiry science is simply instruction that teaches students to follow the scientific method. Many teachers had the opportunity to work within the constraints of the scientific method as students themselves and assume inquiry learning must be the same. Inquiry science is not just about solving problems in six simple steps but much more broadly focused on the intellectual problem-solving skills developed throughout a scientific process. Additionally, not every hands-on lesson can be considered inquiry.

Some educators believe that there is only one true method of inquiry, which would be described as the level four: Open Inquiry. While open inquiry may be the most authentic form of inquiry, there are many skills and a level of conceptual understanding that the students must have developed before they can be successful at this high level of inquiry. While inquiry-based science is considered to be a teaching strategy that fosters higher order thinking in students, it should be one of several methods used. A multifaceted approach to science keeps students engaged and learning.

Not every student is going to learn the same amount from an inquiry lesson; students must be invested in the topic of study to authentically reach the set learning goals. Teachers must be prepared to ask students questions to probe their thinking processes in order to assess accurately. Inquiry-science requires a lot of time, effort, and expertise, however, the benefits outweigh the cost when true authentic learning can take place.

Neuroscience complexity 

The literature states that inquiry requires multiple cognitive processes and variables, such as causality and co-occurrence that enrich with age and experience. 
Kuhn, et al. (2000) used explicit training workshops to teach children in grades six to eight in the United States how to inquire through a quantitative study. By completing an inquiry-based task at the end of the study, the participants demonstrated enhanced mental models by applying different inquiry strategies. In a similar study, Kuhan and Pease (2008) completed a longitudinal quantitative study following a set of American children from grades four to six to investigate the effectiveness of scaffolding strategies for inquiry. Results demonstrated that children benefitted from the scaffolding because they outperformed the grade seven control group on an inquiry task. Understanding the neuroscience of inquiry learning the scaffolding process related to it should be reinforced for Ontario's primary teachers as part of their training.

Notes for educators 

Inquiry-based learning is fundamental for the development of higher order thinking skills. According to Bloom's Taxonomy, the ability to analyze, synthesize, and evaluate information or new understandings indicates a high level of thinking. Teachers should be encouraging divergent thinking and allowing students the freedom to ask their own questions and to learn the effective strategies for discovering the answers. The higher order thinking skills that students have the opportunity to develop during inquiry activities will assist in the critical thinking skills that they will be able to transfer to other subjects.

As shown in the section above on the neuroscience of inquiry learning, it is significant to scaffold students to teach them how to inquire and inquire through the four levels. It cannot be assumed that they know how to inquire without foundational skills. Scaffolding the students at a younger age will result in enriched inquiring learning later.

Inquiry-based learning can be done in multiple formats, including:

 Field-work
 Case studies
 Investigations
 Individual and group projects
 Research projects

Remember to keep in mind...

 Teacher is Facilitator in IBL environment
 Place needs of students and their ideas at the center
 Don't wait for the perfect question, pose multiple open-ended questions. 
 Work towards common goal of understanding
 Remain faithful to the students' line of inquiry
 Teach directly on a need-to-know basis
 Encourage students to demonstrate learning using a range of media

Necessity for teacher training 

There is a necessity for professional collaboration when executing a new inquiry program (Chu, 2009; Twigg, 2010). The teacher training and process of using inquiry learning should be a joint mission to ensure the maximal amount of resources are used and that the teachers are producing the best learning scenarios. The scholarly literature supports this notion. Twigg's (2010) education professionals who participated in her experiment 
emphasized year round professional development sessions, such as workshops, weekly meetings and observations, to ensure inquiry is being implemented in the class correctly. Another example is Chu's (2009) study, where the participants appreciated the professional collaboration of educators, information technicians and librarians to provide more resources and expertise for preparing the structure and resources for the inquiry project. To establish a professional collaboration and researched training methods, administration support is required for funding.

Criticism 

Kirschner, Sweller, and Clark (2006) review of literature found that although constructivists often cite each other's work, empirical evidence is not often cited. Nonetheless the constructivist movement gained great momentum in the 1990s, because many educators began to write about this philosophy of learning.

Hmelo-Silver, Duncan, & Chinn cite several studies supporting the success of the constructivist problem-based and inquiry learning methods. For example, they describe a project called GenScope, an inquiry-based science software application. Students using the GenScope software showed significant gains over the control groups, with the largest gains shown in students from basic courses.

In contrast, Hmelo-Silver et al. also cite a large study by Geier on the effectiveness of inquiry-based science for middle school students, as demonstrated by their performance on high-stakes standardized tests. The improvement was 14% for the first cohort of students and 13% for the second cohort. This study also found that inquiry-based teaching methods greatly reduced the achievement gap for African-American students.

In a 2006 article, the Thomas B. Fordham Institute's president, Chester E. Finn Jr., was quoted as saying "But like so many things in education, it gets carried to excess... [the approach is] fine to some degree.". The organization ran a study in 2005 concluding that the emphasis states put on inquiry-based learning is too great.

Richard E. Mayer from the University of California, Santa Barbara, wrote in 2004 that there was sufficient research evidence to make any reasonable person skeptical about the benefits of discovery learning—practiced under the guise of cognitive constructivism or social constructivism—as a preferred instructional method. He reviewed research on discovery of problem-solving rules culminating in the 1960s, discovery of conservation strategies culminating in the 1970s, and discovery of LOGO programming strategies culminating in the 1980s. In each case, guided discovery was more effective than pure discovery in helping students learn and transfer.

It should be cautioned that inquiry-based learning takes a lot of planning before implementation.  It is not something that can be put into place in the classroom quickly.  Measurements must be put in place for how students knowledge and performance will be measured and how standards will be incorporated.  The teacher's responsibility during inquiry exercises is to support and facilitate student learning (Bell et al., 769–770).  A common mistake teachers make is lacking the vision to see where students' weaknesses lie.  According to Bain, teachers cannot assume that students will hold the same assumptions and thinking processes as a professional within that discipline (p. 201).

While some see inquiry-based teaching as increasingly mainstream, it can be perceived as in conflict with standardized testing common in standards-based assessment systems which emphasise the measurement of student knowledge, and meeting of pre-defined criteria, for example the shift towards "fact" in changes to the National Assessment of Educational Progress as a result of the American No Child Left Behind program.

Additional scholarly research literature 

Chu (2009) used a mixed method design to examine the outcome of an inquiry project completed by students in Hong Kong with the assistance of multiple educators. Chu's (2009) results show that the children were more motivated and academically successful compared to the control group.

Cindy Hmelo-Silver reviewed a number of reports on a variety studies into problem based learning.

Edelson, Gordin and Pea describe five significant challenges to implementing inquiry-based learning and present strategies for addressing them through the design of technology and curriculum. They present a design history covering four generations of software and curriculum to show how these challenges arise in classrooms and how the design strategies respond to them.

See also
 Action learning
 Design-based learning
 Discovery learning
 McMaster Integrated Science
 Networked learning
 Phenomenon-based learning
 POGIL
 Problem-based learning
 Progressive inquiry
 Project-based learning
 Scientific literacy
 Three-part lesson

Notes

References and further reading

External links 

 Inquiry-based middle school lesson plan:  "Born to Run: Artificial Selection Lab" 
 Teaching Inquiry-based Science 
What is Inquiry?

Applied learning
Philosophy of education
Education reform
Standards-based education
Inquiry
Educational practices